Bugs! A Rainforest Adventure is a 2003 IMAX film documenting insect life in the rainforests of Borneo. The movie has a 40-minute runtime and is narrated by Judi Dench. The movie depicts Hierodula and Papilio species, amongst many others.

References

2003 films
2003 short documentary films
IMAX short films
Films set in Indonesia
Films shot in Indonesia
IMAX documentary films